Vyazovka is a rural locality (a village) in Leuzinsky Selsoviet, Kiginsky District, Bashkortostan, Russia. The population was 17 as of 2010. There is 1 street.

Geography 
Vyazovka is located 25 km east of Verkhniye Kigi (the district's administrative centre) by road. Leuza is the nearest rural locality.

References 

Rural localities in Kiginsky District